Kendrick's Cave on the Great Orme, Llandudno, Wales, was the site of important archaeological finds by Thomas Kendrick in 1880. The site is a small natural cavern on the south of the Great Orme Head, a limestone massif on the seaward side of Llandudno (Ordnance Survey ref SH 78008284).

Kendrick, a lapidary, was clearing a cave in his garden to extend his workshop. In the process he found a decorated horse jaw, flint artefacts, bear teeth with holes for use as beads or pendants and human and animal bones. A recent research project involving with the British Museum, the Field Club, Llandudno Museum and Archives, Llandudno and Colwyn Bay Historical Society, the National Museum of Wales, and Oxford and Bradford Universities has reunited the once dispersed finds from the cave.

Human diet
An analysis of stable isotopes in the human bones found shows that they had a diet high in seafood. The individuals from Kendrick’s Cave show evidence of intensive consumption of marine and freshwater foods, including piscivorous marine mammals such as seals.

Radiocarbon dating
The boundary start date for human activity at the site is 16,410–14,070 calibrated years before the present, with a boundary end date of 13,730–13,140 calibrated years before the present. This estimate is subject to more uncertainty than usual because the proportion of stable carbon derived from a marine diet by these humans is uncertain.

Burial site
The presence of un-modified human bones has been taken to indicate that the cave was a burial site rather than a camp site.

Ancient DNA
DNA from one specimen, Kendricks_074, showed that this person was male and carried haplogroup U5a2. A number of British Mesolithic individuals carry the U5 mitochondrial haplogroup, including one individual from Kent’s Cavern who also carried U5a2. Analysis of the 476,347 single nucleotide polymorphisms recovered from Kendricks_074 shows that he shares most drift with the individuals belonging to the ~14,000–7,000-year-old Villabruna genetic cluster. Eleven Mesolithic individuals from elsewhere in the British Isles, the Western Hunter-Gatherer population, can also be modeled as having entirely Villabruna ancestry, except for Cheddar Man with some 85% Villabruna ancestry.

A different contemporary culture with genetically-different individuals
However, a Palaeolithic individual from Gough’s Cave, who possibly lived at approximately the same time as Kendricks_074, shares most drift with the individuals belonging to the ~19,000–14,000-year-old Goyet Q2 genetic cluster. De-fleshing marks and secondary treatment of human material at Gough’s Cave (also found at other Magdalenian culture sites such as Brillenhöhle and Hohle Fels in Germany and Maszycka Cave in Poland) has been taken as evidence of cannibalism. This suggests that at least two different human groups, with different genetic affinities and different dietary and cultural behaviours, were present in Britain during the Late Glacial.

See also 
Kendrick's Cave Decorated Horse Jaw
Prehistoric Wales

References

Further reading 
Sieveking, Ann. A catalogue of Palaeolithic art in the British Museum. London: British Museum Publications, 1987.

External links
Antler pin found in Kendrick's cave, Llandudno. People's Collection Wales.
Decorated Beads from Kendrick's Cave - BBC
From Kendrick's Cave at The Antiquarian's Attic.
Great Orme cave finds are Llandudno Museum top exhibits - BBC News
Isotope evidence for the intensive use of marine foods by Late Upper Palaeolithic humans at the Internet Archive.
Lower Kendrick's Cave at the Megalithic Portal.
Lower Kendrick's Cave: Associated Collection Records - Royal Commission on the Ancient and Historical Monuments of Wales.
Upper Kendrick's Cave: Associated Collection Records - Royal Commission on the Ancient and Historical Monuments of Wales.

Llandudno
Caves of Wales
Landforms of Conwy County Borough